Shin Dong-keun (born 15 February 1981) is a South Korean football midfielder.

Club career statistics

External links
 
 

1981 births
Living people
Association football midfielders
South Korean footballers
Seongnam FC players
Gimcheon Sangmu FC players
K League 1 players
Korea National League players